Pendennis is an unincorporated community in Lane County, Kansas, United States.

History
It was named after the novel Pendennis.

A post office was opened in Pendennis in 1892, and remained in operation until it was discontinued in 1957.

Education
The community is served by Dighton USD 482 public school district.

References

Further reading

External links
 Lane County maps: Current, Historic, KDOT

Unincorporated communities in Lane County, Kansas
Unincorporated communities in Kansas